KEED (1450 AM) is a commercial radio station licensed to serve Eugene, Oregon, United States. The station is currently owned by Mielke Broadcasting Group.

Programming
For several years, the then-KLZS broadcast a Spanish language sports radio format branded as "ESPN Deportes 1450" to the greater Eugene area as an ESPN Deportes affiliate. This programming was aired in conjunction with sister station KXPD (1040 AM) in Portland, Oregon. On November 15, 2009, until the station went dark on December 30, 2009, it broadcast a satellite-fed English language smooth jazz music format branded as "Smooth Jazz Network" from Broadcast Architecture. On the station's return to the air in May 2010, it began broadcasting an oldies format as a simulcast of KKNX (840 AM, "Radio 84"). On November 1, 2012, KLZS switched to a comedy format as All Comedy 1450. The station broadcast a mix of stand up and interviews from the All Comedy Radio Network and local programming with professional comedians from the Eugene-Springfield area.

History
The station was assigned the call sign KLZS on April 22, 2005.

On December 30, 2009, KLZS went off the air citing "substantial decreases in its revenue flow" over the past three years. In its application to the FCC for special temporary authority to remain silent, the station's license holder claimed that "losses have reached the point that the station no longer generates sufficient funds to pay operating expenses" and that the company is seeking to either sell the station or refinance and return to operation. The FCC granted the station authority to remain silent on March 4, 2010.

The station returned to the air on May 11, 2010.

In December 2011, Churchill Media, LLC, applied to the FCC to transfer KLZS and sister station KXOR to "Arlie & Company". Both companies were wholly owned by Suzanne K. Arlie and the transfer was made as a "business reorganization". The FCC approved the move on December 29, 2011, and formal consummation of the transaction took place the same day.

Effective January 15, 2013, KLZS was purchased by Eugene Comedy Radio. Since November 1, 2012, KLZS has been broadcasting a comedy format under the name "All Comedy 1450".

On June 14, 2017, KLZS went silent. Effective July 28, 2017, Eugene Comedy Radio sold KLZS to Mielke Broadcasting Group for $226,000. Mielke changed the station's call sign to its original KEED on August 1, 2017.

On August 2, 2017 KEED returned to the air with a simulcast of oldies-formatted KKNX 840 AM.  On August 7, 2017 KEED changed their format to classic country.

References

External links
KEED 104.3 - 1450 Facebook
FCC History Cards for KEED

EED
1954 establishments in Oregon
Radio stations established in 1954